The 1974–75 DDR-Oberliga was the 26th season of the DDR-Oberliga, the first tier of league football in East Germany.

The league was contested by fourteen teams. 1. FC Magdeburg won the championship, the club's third and last East German championships.

Manfred Vogel of BSG Sachsenring Zwickau was the league's top scorer with 17 goals, while Jürgen Pommerenke of 1. FC Magdeburg won the seasons East German Footballer of the year award.

On the strength of the 1974–75 title Magdeburg qualified for the 1975–76 European Cup where the club was knocked out by Malmö FF in the first round. Seventh-placed club BSG Sachsenring Zwickau qualified for the 1975–76 European Cup Winners' Cup as the seasons FDGB-Pokal winners and was knocked out by R.S.C. Anderlecht in the semi-finals. Second-placed FC Carl Zeiss Jena qualified for the 1975–76 UEFA Cup where it was knocked out in the second round by Stal Mielec while third-placed Dynamo Dresden lost to Liverpool F.C. in the quarter finals.

Table									
The 1974–75 season saw two newly promoted clubs Hallescher FC Chemie and ASG Vorwärts Stralsund.

Results

References

Sources

External links
 Das Deutsche Fussball Archiv  Historic German league tables

1974-75
1
1974–75 in German football leagues